This is a list of chairpersons of the Croatian Democratic Union.

List of officeholders

References  

Croatian Democratic Union
Lists of Croatian politicians